The second season of the De Férias com o Ex: Caribe, also known as De Férias com o Ex Caribe: Salseiro VIP, premiered on MTV on November 15, 2022. It features ten celebrity singles living together on Isla Barú, Colombia with their ex-partners.

Cast 
The list of celebrity cast members was released on August 25, 2022. They include five women; Bifão (De Férias com o Ex 4), Lumena Aleluia (Big Brother Brasil 21), digital influencer Maria Venture, Marina Gregory (The Circle, De Férias com o Ex Celebs 2 and All Star Shore) and singer Mirella, and five men; youtuber Bruno Magri, Lipe Ribeiro (De Férias com o Ex 3 and De Férias com o Ex Celebs) and digital influencers Gabriel Rocha, Lucas Albert and WL Guimarães.

Notable exes include Will Guimarães (Rio Shore 2), singer The Boy (from trap group Recayd Mob), singer Adriel de Menezes (from rap group Pollo) and Matheus Lisboa (Big Brother Brasil 16 and A Fazenda: Nova Chance).

Bold indicates original cast member; all other cast were brought into the series as an ex.

Duration of cast 

Key
  Cast member is featured in this episode
  Cast member arrives on the beach
  Cast member has an ex arrive on the beach
  Cast member arrives on the beach and has an ex arrive during the same episode
  Cast member leaves the beach
  Cast member does not feature in this episode

Episodes

References

External links 
 Official website 

De Férias com o Ex seasons
2022 Brazilian television seasons
Ex on the Beach